Andrew Reed Garbarino (born September 27, 1984) is an American attorney and politician serving as the U.S. representative for New York's 2nd congressional district since 2021. A member of the Republican Party, he served as the New York State Assemblyman for the 7th district from 2013 to 2020.

Early life and education
Garbarino was born and raised in Sayville, New York. He graduated from Sayville High School and earned a Bachelor of Arts degree in history and classical humanities from George Washington University. He then earned a Juris Doctor from Hofstra University School of Law.

Career 
After graduating from law school, Garbarino worked at his family law firm in Sayville. His family also owns numerous small businesses in communities from Bay Shore to Patchogue.

New York State Assembly 
In 2012, Phil Boyle vacated his New York Assembly seat to run for the New York Senate. The New York Republican Party nominated Garbarino to replace him, and he was elected with 56% of the vote. He was reelected three times, in 2014, 2016, and 2018. Garbarino was a member of the New York Conference of Italian-American State Legislators as an assemblyman.

Election history

U.S. House of Representatives

Elections

2020 

Following the announcement that 14-term incumbent Representative Peter T. King would not run for reelection in 2020, Garbarino announced his candidacy for Congress in New York's 2nd congressional district. He ran in the June 23 Republican Party primary, and was endorsed by King, as well as the Nassau County and Suffolk County Republican Parties. He defeated Assemblyman Mike LiPetri, 65% to 35%.

In the general election, Garbarino was the candidate of the Republican Party, the Conservative Party, the Libertarian Party, and the Serve America Movement. He defeated Jackie Gordon, the nominee of the Democratic, Working Families, and Independence parties, 53% to 46%.

Tenure 
Garbarino was sworn in on January 3, 2021.

On January 6, 2021, Garbarino did not object to the Electoral College results, saying:The role of Congress is not to overturn the election or to take actions that silence voters. The Constitution is clear, the votes must be counted and certified by the states and Congress has the constitutional obligation to accept those electors and certify each states’ elections. All 50 states have certified their elections and the majority of electors have cast their votes for President-Elect Joe Biden. While I join many Long Islanders in wishing the results were different, Congress does not have the constitutional authority to overturn the election.In March 2021, Garbarino was one of eight House Republicans to vote for the Bipartisan Background Checks Act of 2021.

Garbarino voted against the American Rescue Plan Act of 2021, as did every congressional Republican.

On May 19, 2021, Garbarino was one of 35 Republicans who joined all Democrats in voting to approve legislation to establish the January 6, 2021 commission meant to investigate the storming of the U.S. Capitol. On November 5, 2021, Garbarino was one of 13 House Republicans who voted with a majority of Democrats in favor of the Infrastructure Investment and Jobs Act. Trump excoriated House Republicans who voted for the bill.

LGBT rights
In 2021, Garbarino co-sponsored the Fairness for All Act, the Republican alternative to the Equality Act. The bill would prohibit discrimination on the basis of sex, sexual orientation, and gender identity, and protect the free exercise of religion.

On July 19, 2022, Garbarino and 46 other Republican representatives voted for the Respect for Marriage Act, which would codify the right to same-sex marriage in federal law.

Committee assignments 
 Committee on Homeland Security
 Committee on Small Business

Caucus memberships 
 Problem Solvers Caucus
Republican Main Street Partnership
 Republican Governance Group

Personal life 
Garbarino is Catholic. He resides in Bayport.

References

External links

 Representative Andrew Garbarino official U.S. House website
 The New York Assembly: Andrew R. Garbarino
 Campaign website
 
 

|-

|-

1984 births
Living people
21st-century American politicians
American Roman Catholics
Columbian College of Arts and Sciences alumni
Maurice A. Deane School of Law alumni
Republican Party members of the New York State Assembly
People from Sayville, New York
Republican Party members of the United States House of Representatives from New York (state)
American people of Italian descent
Catholics from New York (state)